George W. Alexander (October 28, 1904 – May 16, 1992) was a Republican member of the Pennsylvania House of Representatives.

References

Republican Party members of the Pennsylvania House of Representatives
1904 births
1992 deaths
20th-century American politicians